Miriam Ferrer (born 18 June 1963) is a retired Cuban sprinter. She represented her country at the 1993 World Championships reaching the quarterfinals. At the same championships she was part of the 4 × 100 metres relay team that set the still standing Cuban record.

Her personal best in the event is 11.15 set in Mexico City in 1992.

International competitions

References

1963 births
Living people
Cuban female sprinters
Athletes from Havana
Athletes (track and field) at the 1995 Pan American Games
World Athletics Championships athletes for Cuba
Central American and Caribbean Games gold medalists for Cuba
Central American and Caribbean Games silver medalists for Cuba
Competitors at the 1993 Central American and Caribbean Games
Pan American Games medalists in athletics (track and field)
Pan American Games silver medalists for Cuba
Central American and Caribbean Games medalists in athletics
Competitors at the 1990 Goodwill Games
Competitors at the 1994 Goodwill Games
Goodwill Games medalists in athletics
Medalists at the 1995 Pan American Games
20th-century Cuban women
20th-century Cuban people
21st-century Cuban women